Derby Dam is a diversion dam built from 1903 to 1905 on the Truckee River, located about  east of Reno in Storey and Washoe counties in Nevada, United States. It diverts water into the Truckee Canal that would otherwise enter  Pyramid Lake. The canal feeds Lake Lahontan reservoir in the Carson River watershed, where it is used for irrigation.

It was the first project of the newly organized U.S. Reclamation Service (known today as the U.S. Bureau of Reclamation), organized by the Reclamation Act of 1902.

The dam is operated by the Truckee-Carson Irrigation District. It was named after the Derby Southern Pacific Railroad station.

History 

The dam was constructed for the U.S. Bureau of Reclamation following an authorization for construction issued on March 14, 1903. Construction commenced on October 2, 1903, and was completed on May 20, 1905.

The project was authorized on March 14, 1903, by Secretary of the Interior Ethan A. Hitchcock. The dam is an original feature of the Newlands Reclamation Project, named after Nevada Congressman Francis Newlands, who sponsored the Reclamation Act. Not surprisingly, a dam in Newlands, Nevada launched the project. It was the first of five projects authorized and built under the Reclamation Act of 1902.

With passage of the act, the federal government assumed a major role in designing and constructing large-scale irrigation projects throughout the West.

The dam is not designed for water storage. It was listed on the National Register of Historic Places in 1978 as the "Derby Diversion Dam."

Environmental impact 

Water diverted at Derby Dam to farms in Lahontan Valley constitutes as much as three-fourths of the flow of the Truckee River, the largest diversion of water from the Truckee River after it flows from Lake Tahoe.

The reduction in flow to Pyramid Lake and the inability of  Lahontan cutthroat trout (the "salmon-trout" as described by Frémont) to bypass the dam for spawning eliminated them from Lake Lahontan and its tributaries and caused the near extinction of the species. But in 1979 a remnant population of the original Pyramid Lake cutthroat trout was discovered in a small brook on Pilot Peak, on the Nevada/Utah border. This population was used to successfully restock Lake Lahontan.

See also
Winnemucca Lake
Cui-ui
DSSAM Model

References

This article contains content from United States government sources in the public domain.

United States Bureau of Reclamation dams
Dams completed in 1903
Dams on the National Register of Historic Places in Nevada
Buildings and structures in Storey County, Nevada
National Register of Historic Places in Storey County, Nevada
National Register of Historic Places in Washoe County, Nevada
Nevada historical markers
1903 establishments in Nevada